Majadahonda HC (previously known as CH Majadahonda) is an ice hockey team in Majadahonda, Spain. They play in the Liga Nacional de Hockey Hielo.

History
They were founded in 1992 to replace CH Boadilla, which had folded two years earlier. The club did not participate in the Superliga from 2002-2004, but returned to the league in 2004 and has played there ever since. They won the Superliga in 1998, and made it to the semifinals of the Copa del Rey in 1998 and 2002.

Notable players
Swede Kent Nilsson played for the team in 1997-98.

References

External links
SAD Majadahonda Facebook

Ice hockey teams in Spain
Ice hockey clubs established in 1992
Sport in Majadahonda
1992 establishments in Spain